Sandy Point State Forest is a state forest located in King William County, Virginia.   in size, it is characterized by its concentration of water-based resources, and recreational activities are allowed on the property, as are hunting and fishing..

References
Forest webpage

Virginia state forests
Protected areas of King William County, Virginia
Protected areas established in 2002
2002 establishments in Virginia